A mini survival kit contains essential outdoor survival tools and supplies. It is intended to be carried on one's person at all times, be appropriate to all environments, and be a comprehensive kit without being too large. Mini survival kits are intended to provide the basic needs of a survival situation, self-rescue, assistance or a return to normalcy in optimum situations.

Two philosophies surround the preparation of mini survival kits. Some are prepared with a few comparatively large items such as a knife, matches, a whistle, emergency food, and water bottle. Others are a collection of small, useful items such as rubber bands, paper clips, fishing equipment, lashing material, and razor blades. The technique depends on factors such as one's physical condition, survival skills, and wilderness knowledge.

Container 
Survival tools and supplies found in a mini survival kit are generally kept in a container that is small enough to fit into a pocket. Small confectionery tins are commonly used but regular tobacco boxes, specially purchased mini-survival kit tins, life capsules, 35mm film canisters, plastic bottles, tin cans, and boxes are also commonly used. The common breath mint containers such as Altoids tins measure approximately  x  x .  Some kinds of containers benefit from waterproofing, which may be done with adhesive tape or by dipping the closed container in paraffin wax.

Mini-survival-kit items can be carried on a neck chain, a satchel, a pouch or a belt pouch. Survival items may also be part of the belt itself.

Contents 

Because each kit depends on the situation and environment of the user, they can vary greatly. Listed below are common items one might find in a mini survival kit:

 Small fire sources such as butane lighters, matches, tinder and ferrocerium rod or "life boat matches" and striker board;
 Signal devices (LED micro lights, small heliographs or survival whistles);
 Candles, which can be used for emergency food if made from tallow;
 Cutting tools, such as flexible wire, collapsible saws, or pocket knives;
 String, fishing line, wire, finishing nails, and safety pins for tying off or affixing shelter materials;

Food and water procurement 
 Fishing line and assorted fishing hooks;
 Snare wire; malleable copper or brass wire is often used, as well as steel 'trip wire' or utility wire;
 Dental floss for use as string;
 Water purification bags, often used to keep tinder dry or for water storage / transportation;
 Glucose tablets or hard candy;
 Water purification sources, including chemical purification means such as Potassium permanganate or bleach;
 Non-lubricated condoms, used for their capability to expand to store a large quantity of water.

Navigation 
 Button-sized compass;
 Magnetized needle and thread to use a makeshift compass;

First aid 
 Wound treatment and antiseptic, such as potassium permanganate or iodine tablets
 Scalpel or utility knife blades for minor surgery and fine work
 Plasters and bandages
 Cyanoacrylate glue is adaptable to the size and shape of injury
 Prescription medication for pain, such as Paracetamol or Vicoden

Miscellaneous 
In addition to the items marked above, the following items are also frequently found in many mini-survival kits (depending on the area the operator is expecting to be in, personal experience, multiple use considerations, serviceability, and durability). In some kits, certain items marked above can also have been completely replaced by certain items below.  Items and many of their uses are listed along with alternative uses and/or alternative items to perform the role in the kit.

Tweezers
 Files
 Information cards
 Candle kit components 
 Rubbing alcohol, wipes or Povidone-Iodine Prep Pads
 Needles or sewing awls and yarn
 Butterfly closures
 Braided nylon cords
 Waterproof paper
 Plastic bags
 Compressed sponges
 Aluminium foil 
 Baking soda
 Electrical tape
 Parachute cord
 Sharpening stone
 Systemic analgesics such as aspirin or paracetamol
 Anti-malaria tablets
 Broad spectrum antibiotics such as Azithromycin
 Antihistamine, for first aid against insect bites/stings and allergies
 Anti-diarrhea medication such as Loperamide
 Tritium or Superluminova kit markers
 Magnifying glasses or Fresnel lenses

See also 
Bushcraft
Hiking equipment
Survival kit
Survival skills

References

External links 

 
 
 

Survival equipment
Hiking equipment